Myron Neth (born November 20, 1968) is an American politician who served in the Missouri House of Representatives from 2011 to 2015.

References

1968 births
Living people
People from North Kansas City, Missouri
Republican Party members of the Missouri House of Representatives